The dingonek is a creature said to have been seen near Lake Victoria in 1907 by big game hunter John Alfred Jordan and members of his hunting party, as recounted by fellow big-game hunter Edgar Beecher Bronson in his 1910 memoir In Closed Territory. This account was followed by an article published in 1913 in the East Africa Natural History Society by Charles William Hobley, in which he claims to have encountered further accounts of similarly described creatures. In 1918, an article published by MacLean's declared that the beast was a newly discovered animal species.

In Closed Territory
The sole description of this creature occurs in big game hunter Edgar Beecher Bronson's 1910 memoir In Closed Territory. In the memoir, Bronson recounts a campsite discussion involving the creature with fellow big-game hunter John Alfred Jordan. After musing about the okapi, Bronson reports that Jordan said the following:

According to Bronson, Jordan claims he encountered the beast with his hunting party ("Mataia, the boy there, and Mosoni with me"). One member of the party, Mataia, claims to have seen it twice, yet Bronson expressed skepticism. Jordan says he encountered the creature while heading to the Maggori, when:

Jordan hurried to the Maggori and saw the creature as described. He describes it as follows:

Jordan notes that its fangs appeared "long enough to go clean through a man", and he describes how he sat and waited watching the creature. In time, he feared the creature might move and see him, and he fired a .303 rifle behind "his leopard ear". The creature sprang out of the water, and Jordan sprinted into the bush in terror.

In time, Jordan calmed and listened for the beast as his party ran deeper into the bush. Jordan says that although he searched for the beast along shorelines and bodies of water over "several miles" for two days after the encounter, he never again encountered the beast nor its tracks.

According to Bronson, Jordan then asked him to inquire with his hunting party about what they witnessed. Through an interpreter, Bronson claims they providing nearly identical descriptions of the beast. Bronson follows this account by noting that when he visited Uganda "in November last", he met with "ex-Collector James Martin" who told him that "a great water serpent or reptile was seen on or near the north shore of the lake, which was worshipped by the natives, who believed its coming a harbinger of heavy crops and large increase of their flocks and herds."

Finally, Bronson says that:

Charles William Hobley
In 1913, Charles William Hobley published an article in the Journal of East Africa Uganda Natural History Society, in which he discusses "Some Unidentified Beasts" and mentions Bronson's account. According to Hobley:

Hobley theorizes that Bronson's account may be connected to "the greatest rarity which has not yet been bagged [which] would appear to be the extraordinary creature which is said to inhabit certain of the rivers running into Lake Victoria and the lake itself". He mentions several accounts of lake monsters in the region alongside Bronson's account.

Maclean's
In 1918, Canadian magazine Maclean's reprinted material from an article by Jordan himself in The Wide World Magazine, and declared that his evidence for the dingonek "is very positive and believable." According to Jordan:
It lives in Lake Victoria Nyanza and its numerous tributaries, and there is no record of the monster having been seen in any other part of the world. Whether it is a descendant of one of the huge prehistoric saurions that has by a process of adaptation – living as it does in impenetrable regions far away from the encroachments of civilized man – continued with but slight modifications through prodigious ages to the present time, or whether it is an unclassified reptile or amphibian, it is equally impossible to say, as no specimen exists either of its bones or of its skin. That this monster does exist, however, there can be no particle of doubt, as the testimony of authoritative eye-witnesses cannot be reasonably discredited.

Notes

References 

 

African folklore
East African legendary creatures
Purported mammals
Water monsters